Flex-Able is the debut studio album by American virtuoso guitarist Steve Vai. This was his first as a solo artist, and was created in Stucco Blue, a shed converted into a studio in Vai's old back garden. It is very different from many of his other albums, and is largely influenced by Frank Zappa. Flex-Able does not rely as much on massive guitar arrangements and shred moments as the rest of his output from the 1990s onwards, with the exception of Leftovers which is a compilation of bonus tracks and remasters from his sessions at 'Stucco Blue'.

The cover of the May 2009 issue of Guitar World features a photograph of Vai in a pose similar to the album's cover, including the bending guitar neck.

Track listing (Original LP release)

The album was originally released on vinyl in 1984.

All songs written by Steve Vai.

Side one 
"Little Green Men" – 5:39
"Viv Woman" – 3:09
"Lovers Are Crazy" – 5:39
"Salamanders in the Sun" – 2:26
"The Boy/Girl Song" – 4:02

Side two 
"The Attitude Song" – 3:23
"Call It Sleep" – 5:09
"Junkie" – 7:23
"Bill's Private Parts" – 0:16
"Next Stop Earth" – 0:34
"There's Something Dead in Here" – 3:46

Track listing (extend edition re-release) 

The album was re-released on CD in 1988 by Akashic Records, with four bonus tracks from the Flex-Able Leftovers EP; and again remastered and reissued by Epic Records in 1997, with the same track listing as the Akashic reissue. There is also one European reissue on Curcio Records (released in 1992 in Italy) that features the same cover on the vinyl and just the first eleven tracks.

All songs written by Steve Vai unless otherwise indicated.

 "Little Green Men" – 5:39
 "Viv Woman" – 3:09
 "Lovers Are Crazy" – 5:39
 "Salamanders in the Sun" – 2:26
 "The Boy/Girl Song" – 4:02
 "The Attitude Song" – 3:23
 "Call It Sleep" – 5:09
 "Junkie" – 7:23
 "Bill's Private Parts" – 0:16
 "Next Stop Earth" – 0:34
 "There's Something Dead in Here" – 3:46
Bonus From Flex-Able Leftovers EP
 "So Happy" (Steve Vai, Laurel Fishman) – 2:44
 "Bledsoe Bluvd" – 4:22
 "Burnin' Down the Mountain" – 4:22
 "Chronic Insomnia" – 2:05

Trivia 

The first song on the album, 'Little Green Men', is dedicated to Nina Hagen.

Personnel 

 Steve Vai – electric guitar, acoustic guitar, synthesizer, bass, percussion, piano, keyboards, sitar, vocals, bells, producer, engineer, drum machine, drum programming, design, and mixing

Additional Musicians
 Scott Collard – synthesizer, keyboards, Fender Rhodes
 Larry Crane – lyre, xylophone, bells, vibraphone
 Greg Degler – clarinet, flute, saxophone
 Joe Despagni – sound effects
 Laurel Fishman – vocals
 Peggy Foster – bass
 Chris Frazier – drums
 Stuart Hamm – bass, sound effects, vocals, vocals (background)
 Bob Harris – trumpet, vocals (as Irney Rantin)
 Suzannah Harris (as Ursula Rayven) – vocals
 Billy James – percussion, drums
 Paul Lemcke – keyboards
 Pia Maiocco – vocals
 Tommy Mars – violin, keyboards, vocals
 Lill Vai – sound effects
 Chad Wackerman – drums
 Pete Zeldman – percussion, drums

Production
 William Becton – composer
 Aaron Brown – design, illustrations
 John Matousek – mastering
 Mark Pinske – assistant
 Neil Zlozower – photography

References

Steve Vai albums
1984 debut albums
Epic Records albums
Progressive rock albums by American artists